Euthanasia: Opposing Viewpoints is a 2000 book in the Opposing Viewpoints series.

Description 
It presents selections of contrasting points of view on four central questions about euthanasia: whether it is ethical; whether it should be legalized; whether legalizing it would lead to involuntary killing; and whether physicians should assist in suicide.

It was edited by James D. Torr.

2000 non-fiction books
Books in the Opposing Viewpoints series
Euthanasia
Greenhaven Press books